Mount Hulshagen is a mountain,  high, standing  northwest of Mount Bastin on the north side of the Belgica Mountains, Antarctica. It was discovered by the Belgian Antarctic Expedition, 1957–58, under G. de Gerlache, who named it for Charles Hulshagen, a vehicle mechanic with the expedition.

References

Mountains of Queen Maud Land
Princess Ragnhild Coast